High Heat may refer to

 High Heat (2023), American action film
 High Heat (2022), Mexican drama streaming television series
 High Heat (2003),  American young adult novel

See also 
 High Heat Major League Baseball (1998-2003), baseball video game series